The Cal Expo Amphitheatre was a 14,000-capacity outdoor amphitheatre located in Sacramento, California on the site of the California Exposition.

The Cal Expo Amphitheatre opened in 1983 and hosted many famous artists such as Judas Priest, Bon Jovi, Van Halen, Rush, Metallica, Iron Maiden, Aerosmith, Bob Dylan, and Phish, as well as twenty-five performances by the Grateful Dead between 1984 and 1994. The venue closed September 1998. The site is now home to Heart Health Park.

References

Amphitheaters in California
Former music venues in California